Randy Scott is an American sportscaster who currently works for ESPN.  He previously served as a sports anchor for WNUR sports radio. He began his career with a job of anchor and reporter in KSWO-TV in Oklahoma but soon moved to WNEG-TV which kick-started his career in sports journalism as he became a sports director there. After working on the position for a while, he joined WINK-TV. He then again served as the anchor and reporter for NESN in Boston before joining ESPN in June 2012.

Early life
Randy is a native of Vienna, Virginia. His dad served in the US Navy: "When my family finally settled in the Washington, D.C., area after moving around the country because of my dad’s service in the Navy, I remember watching Warner Wolf on the local CBS affiliate and George Michael on the local NBC affiliate. " Scott graduated from Northwestern University in 2004 with a degree in journalism.

Career
Scott was a stand-up comedian for a short period of time: "I tried my hand at standup comedy when I was living in Tampa, Fla. The high-water mark came in my second night on stage at the Improv in Ybor City. I won a newcomer contest, $100 for five minutes, and told my wife I thought maybe I could do that for a career. She informed me I was, in fact, incorrect." 
Scott was hired by ESPN in June 2012. He currently anchors morning SportsCenter.

Awards

Scott earned Florida's Associated Press and Society of Professional Journalists (SPJ, a national organization dedicated to the perpetuation of a free press) “Best Sports Feature” awards in 2008 for “Deaf Softball Star,” described by SPJ: This feature is both interesting and inspirational without being heavy-handed. Use of sign language like the pitcher and her teammates use was a good touch. He also received 2005 “Best Sports Promotion” honors from the Oklahoma Association of Broadcasters.

References

External links
Scott's profile on ESPN.com

American sports journalists
American television reporters and correspondents
American television sports anchors
Medill School of Journalism alumni
ESPN people
Disney people
Living people
21st-century American journalists
Year of birth missing (living people)